The Piano Sonata in E-flat major, Hob. XVI/52, L. 62, was written in 1794 by Joseph Haydn. It is the last of Haydn's piano sonatas, and is widely considered his greatest. It has been the subject of extensive analysis by distinguished musicological personages such as Heinrich Schenker and Sir Donald Tovey, largely because of its expansive length, unusual harmonies and interesting development. The sonata is sometimes referred to as number 62 based on the numbering of Landon instead of the numbering of Hoboken.

History

Haydn wrote the work for Therese Jansen, an outstanding pianist who lived in London at the time of Haydn's visits there in the 1790s. Haydn served as a witness at her wedding to Gaetano Bartolozzi (16 May 1795). Haydn also dedicated three demanding piano trios (H. XV:27–29) and another two piano sonatas (H. XVI:50 and 51) to Jansen.

With regard to the E-flat sonata, Jansen was evidently the dedicatee of the autograph (hand-written) score but not the first published version. On the title page of the autograph Haydn wrote in Italian, " Lond. 794," which means "Sonata composed for the celebrated Miss Theresa Jansen ... by myself Joseph Haydn in my own hand, London 1794."

Daniel Heartz implies that Haydn may have left the sonata unpublished for some time so that Jansen could have the work for her exclusive use. Ultimately, Haydn had the work published in Vienna in 1798, three years after he had returned there from London. The publisher was Artaria, and the dedicatee for the published version was the pianist Magdalena von Kurzbeck (1767–1845). A London edition, perhaps instigated by Jansen, appeared with Longman and Clementi in 1800 with the title "A grand new sonata for the piano forte composed expressly for Mrs. Bartolozzi, Op. 78."

Structure
The work has three movements:

The first movement takes approximately 7 to 8 minutes to perform with the repeat (without, it is approximately 5 minutes), the second movement 6.5 to 7.5 minutes, and the third movement 5 to 6 minutes.

Its harmonic exploration is unusually broad for Haydn's solo piano writing. It has a strong rhythmic character and forward momentum.

The second movement, an adagio in ternary form, is in the key of E major, a distant key to the key of the piece (E-flat major). Throughout the movement, Haydn uses improvisatory figures such as repeated notes increasing in speed, wide arpeggios, and scalar runs. 

The third movement is a lively rondo. Haydn’s use of fermatas, a written adagio section in the middle of the movement, and the perpetual motion passages again show the improvisatory and virtuosic nature of this whole piece.

References
Notes

Sources

External links 

 Performance of Piano Sonata Hob. XVI/52 by Charlie Albright from the Isabella Stewart Gardner Museum in MP3 format
 , Wilhelm Backhaus
 , Valentina Lisitsa

Piano sonatas by Joseph Haydn
1794 compositions
Compositions in E-flat major
Music dedicated to ensembles or performers